Alibey is a Turkic word that may refer to several places:

Turkey
 Cunda Island, called Alibey Island in Turkish
 Alibey Dam, a dam in Istanbul Province
 Alibey, Bismil
 Alibey, Ilgaz
 Alibey, Kızılcahamam, a village in the Kızılcahamam district of Ankara Province, Turkey
 Alibey, Osmancık
 Alibey, Silvan
 Alibey, Susurluk, a village

Ukraine
 Alibey Lagoon, Ukraine

See also
 Alibeyli (disambiguation)
 Alibeyce, Emirdağ, a Turkish village in Afyonkarahisar Province